John Williamson Nevin (February 20, 1803June 6, 1886), was an American theologian and educationalist. He was born in the Cumberland Valley, near Shippensburg, Franklin County, Pennsylvania. He was the father of noted sculptor and poet Blanche Nevin.

Biography
He was a nephew of Hugh Williamson of North Carolina, and was of Scottish blood and Presbyterian training. He graduated at Union College in 1821; studied theology at Princeton Theological Seminary in 1823–1828, being in 1826–28 in charge of the classes of Charles Hodge; was licensed to preach by the Carlisle Presbytery in 1828; and in 1830–1840 was professor of Biblical literature in the newly founded Western Theological Seminary (now Pittsburgh Theological Seminary) of Allegheny, Pennsylvania.

But under the influence of Neander, he was gradually breaking away from "Puritanic Presbyterianism", and, in 1840, having resigned his chair in Allegheny, he was appointed professor of theology in the (German Reformed) Theological Seminary at Mercersburg, and thus passed from the Presbyterian Church into the German Reformed Church. He soon became prominent: first by his contributions to its organ, the Messenger; then by The Anxious Bench—A Tract for the Times (1843), attacking the vicious excesses of revivalistic methods; and by his defence of the inauguration address, The Principle of Protestantism, delivered by his colleague Philip Schaff, which aroused a storm of protest by its suggestion that Pauline Protestantism was not the last word in the development of the church but that a Johannine Christianity was to be its out-growth, and by its recognition of Petrine Romanism as a stage in ecclesiastical development. To Dr. Schaff's 122 theses of The Principle of Protestantism Nevin added his own theory of the mystical union between Christ and believers, and both Schaff and Nevin were accused of a "Romanizing tendency".

Nevin characterized his critics as pseudo-Protestants, urged (with Dr. Charles Hodge, and against the Presbyterian General Assembly) the validity of Roman Catholic baptism, and defended the doctrine of the "spiritual real presence" of Christ in the Lord's Supper, notably in The Mystical Presence: a Vindication of the Reformed or Calvinistic Doctrine of the Holy Eucharist (1846); to this Charles Hodge replied from the point of view of rationalistic puritanism in the Princeton Review of 1848.

In 1849, the Mercersburg Review was founded as the organ of Nevin and the "Mercersburg Theology"; and to it he contributed from 1849 to 1883. In 1851, he resigned from the Mercersburg Seminary in order that its running expenses might be lightened; and from 1841 to 1853 he was president of Marshall College at Mercersburg. With Dr. Schaff and others, he was on the committee which prepared the liturgy of the German Reformed Church, which appeared in provisional form in 1857 and as An Order of Worship in 1866. In 1861–1866, he was instructor of history at Franklin and Marshall College (into which Marshall College had been merged), of which he was president in 1866–1876. He died in Lancaster, Pennsylvania, on June 6, 1886.

Works 
Published works:

Address on Sacred Music (1827)
The Scourge of God: A Sermon (1832)
The Anxious Bench—A Tract for the Times (1843)
The Mystical Presence: a Vindication of the Reformed or Calvinistic Doctrine of the Holy Eucharist (1846)
History and Genius of the Heidelberg Catechism (1847)
A Summary of Biblical Antiquities; For the Use of Schools, Bible-Classes and Families (1849)
Human Freedom and a Plea for Philosophy: Two Essays (1850)
Man's True Destiny (1853)
Life and Character of Frederick Augustus Rauch (1859)
The Liturgical Question: with Reference To The Provisional Liturgy of the German Reformed Church (1862)
A Treatise on the Mercersburg Theology; or, Mercersburg and Modern Theology (1866)
Vindication of the Revised Liturgy, Historical and Theological (1867)

References

Notes

Citations

Sources

Further reading 

 . containing Nevin's more important articles.
 . 
 .
 
 .
 . A contemporaneous critique of Nevin's theology written by the editor of The Reformed Church Magazine.

External links
 
 

1803 births
1886 deaths
19th-century Calvinist and Reformed theologians
American Calvinist and Reformed theologians
American Evangelical and Reformed Church members
American evangelicals
People from Cumberland County, Pennsylvania
People from Franklin County, Pennsylvania
People from Lancaster, Pennsylvania
Presidents of Franklin & Marshall College
Princeton Theological Seminary alumni
Union College (New York) alumni